Mectemycor is a genus of beetles in the family Mauroniscidae, historically included in the family Melyridae. The three known species of this genus are found in western North America, and all are endemic to California.

Species
 Mectemycor linearis (Fall, 1910)
 Mectemycor sericeus Majer, 1995
 Mectemycor strangulatus Majer, 1995

References

Cleroidea
Cleroidea genera